The 2018–19 Men's V-League was the 15th season of the Men's V-League, the highest professional men's volleyball league in South Korea. It is sponsored by Dodram and known as The Dodram 2018–19 Men's V-League for sponsorship purposes. The season started on 13 October 2018 and concluded on 26 March 2019.

Teams

Format

Regular season
Regular season plays a sextuple round-robin (triple home and away matches) and each single round-robin is called a round. Each team plays 36 games in the regular season.

Regular season standing procedure
 Match points
 Number of matches won
 Sets ratio
 Points ratio
 Result of the last match between the tied teams

Match won 3–0 or 3–1: 3 match points for the winner, 0 match points for the loser
Match won 3–2: 2 match points for the winner, 1 match point for the loser

Postseason
The top three teams in the regular season standing will qualify for the postseason. However, if the difference between the 3rd and 4th place team is within three match points, the 4th place team will also qualify. The lowest-qualifying team face off in a stepladder system, where each winners then faces the next-highest team, culminating in the finals against the top-ranked team.

Semi-playoff (if necessary): 3rd place team vs. 4th place team – Single match
Playoffs: 2nd place team vs. 3rd place team or Semi-playoff winners – Best-of-three series
Finals: 1st place team vs. Playoffs winners – Best-of-five series

Final standing procedure
 Finals winners
 Finals losers
 Playoffs losers
 Regular season 4th place team or Semi-playoff losers
 Regular season 5th place team
 Regular season 6th place team
 Regular season 7th place team

Regular season
All times are Korea Standard Time (UTC+09:00).

First round

Second round

Third round

Fourth round

Fifth round

Sixth round

Postseason
All times are Korea Standard Time (UTC+09:00).

Playoffs

Finals

Final standing

References

External links
KOVO 
KOVO 

Vleague
Vleague
V-League (South Korea)